Zdzisław Antoni Nowak (10 January 1906 – 26 June 1996) was a Polish athlete (high jumper and long jumper). He competed in the men's long jump at the 1928 Summer Olympics.

References

External links
 

1906 births
1996 deaths
Athletes (track and field) at the 1928 Summer Olympics
Polish male long jumpers
Olympic athletes of Poland
Polish male high jumpers
People from Tarnów